The Opening Act is a 2020 American comedy film written and directed by Steve Byrne, in his directorial debut. It stars Jimmy O. Yang, Alex Moffat, Cedric the Entertainer, Neal Brennan, Bill Burr, Whitney Cummings, Jermaine Fowler, Ken Jeong, Russell Peters, and Debby Ryan.

It was released on October 16, 2020, by RLJE Films.

Premise
The film follows Will Chu whose true life passion is to become a stand-up comedian. When he is given the opportunity to emcee a comedy show, opening for his hero, Billy G. he must decide if he wants to continue the life he has set up or pursue his dream, the life of a comedian.

Cast
 Jimmy O. Yang as Will Chu 
 Cedric the Entertainer as Billy G
 Whitney Cummings as Brooke
 Ken Jeong as Quinn
 Debby Ryan as Jen
 Alex Moffat as Chris Palmer
 Iliza Shlesinger as Val
 Neal Brennan as Chip
 Russell Peters as Randy
 Bill Burr as Barry
 Anjelah Johnson as Chrissy
 Tom Segura as Cop
 Roy Wood Jr. as Gary
 Felipe Esparza as Cabbie Steve
 Jermaine Fowler as Ricky
 Jackie Tohn as Megan

Production
In June 2018, it was announced Jimmy O. Yang, Neal Brennan, Russell Peters, Debby Ryan, Bill Burr, Anjelah Johnson, Tom Segura and Roy Wood Jr. had joined the cast of the film, with Steve Byrne, directing from a screenplay he wrote. Vince Vaughn and Peter Billingsley will serve as producers under their Wild West Picture Show Productions banner. In July 2018, Cedric the Entertainer, Whitney Cummings, Ken Jeong, Jermaine Fowler, Iliza Shlesinger, Alex Moffat, and Felipe Esparza joined the cast of the film.

Filming
In June 2018, it was reported that principal photography for the film had already begun in Los Angeles.

Release
In September 2020, RLJE Films acquired distribution rights to the film and set it for a October 16, 2020, release.

Reception
The website's critics consensus reads: "With The Opening Act, writer-director Steve Byrne offers perceptive insights on the struggles faced by budding stand-up comedians -- and creative dreamers in general."

References

External links
 
 

2020 comedy films
American comedy films
2020s English-language films
Films about actors
Films about comedians
Films shot in Los Angeles
2020 films
2020 directorial debut films
2020s American films